The Tyre headquarters bombings were two suicide bombings against the Israel Defense Forces' headquarters building in Tyre, Lebanon, in 1982 and 1983. The blasts killed 103 Israelis and 46–59 Lebanese, wounding 95 people and were some of the worst losses ever for the IDF. The second attack occurred in November 1983 and was attributed to Hezbollah.

First bombing
After invading Lebanon in June, the Israeli military set up command posts to run the cities they occupied. On November 11, 1982, a Peugeot car packed with explosives struck the seven-story building being used by the Israeli military to govern Tyre. The explosion leveled the building and killed 75 Israeli soldiers, border policemen, and Shin Bet agents. In addition, anywhere from 14–27 Lebanese and Palestinian prisoners that were being held by Israel were killed. Twenty-seven Israelis and 28 Arabs were injured.

The Israeli government said soon after the blast, and insists to this day, that the explosion was an accident resulting from gas cylinders exploding. This is contrary to the three witnesses who saw the Peugeot speed to the building, the identification of the car's parts in the rubble of the building, and the existence of a Shin Bet report detailing the Hezbollah preparations for the bombing.

There is a monument near Baalbek, Lebanon, dedicated to 17-year-old Ahmad Qasir, the suicide bomber responsible for the attack.

Second bombing
Almost a year later, a nearly identical bombing happened in Tyre. On November 4, 1983, a suicide bomber drove a pickup truck filled with explosives into a Shin Bet building at an IDF base in Tyre. The explosion killed 28 Israelis and 32 Lebanese prisoners, and wounded about 40 others. The attack was carried out by the Shia Lebanese organization Hezbollah.

See also
1983 Beirut barracks bombing
1983 United States embassy bombing

References

External links
 When in Rome, don't forget the bombs of 1983 – Article on Ahmed Qassir
 Sacrifice and "Self-Martyrdom" in Shi'ite Lebanon
 Suicide Superpower: Martyrdom as a Weapon of Mass Destruction 

1982 in international relations
1983 in international relations
Attacks on buildings and structures in 1982
Attacks on buildings and structures in 1983
Attacks on military installations in the 1980s
Building bombings in Lebanon
Hezbollah attacks
Improvised explosive device bombings in 1982
Israel Defense Forces disasters
Israeli–Lebanese conflict
November 1982 events in Asia
November 1983 events in Asia
Suicide bombings in 1983
Suicide car and truck bombings in Lebanon
Headquarters bombings
1983 disasters in Israel 
1983 disasters in Lebanon 
1982 disasters in Israel 
1982 disasters in Lebanon